Dwarakanath Shantaram Kotnis  Marathi language Marathi ; 10 October 1910 in India – 9 December 1942 in China), also known by his Chinese name Ke Dihua, was one of the five Indian physicians dispatched to China to provide medical assistance during the Second Sino-Japanese War in 1938.  Known for his dedication and perseverance, he has been regarded as an example for Sino-Indian friendship and collaboration.

Along with the Canadian Dr. Norman Bethune, he continues to be revered every year by the Chinese people during the Qingming Festival, a day used by the Chinese to commemorate the martyrs.

Early life 
Dwarakanath Kotnis was born to a middle class Marathi Deshastha Rigvedi Brahmin family in Solapur, Maharashtra, he had two brothers and five sisters. He studied medicine at the Seth G.S. Medical College of the University of Bombay.

Indian medical mission 

In 1938, after the Japanese invasion of China, the communist General Zhu De requested Jawaharlal Nehru to send some physicians to China. Netaji Subhash Chandra Bose, the President of the Indian National Congress, made an appeal to the people through a press statement on 30 June 1938. He arranged to send a team of volunteer doctors and an ambulance by collecting a fund of Rs 22,000 on the All-Indian China Day and China Fund days on 7–9 July. Netaji Subhash Chandra Bose also wrote an article in Modern Review on Japan's role in the Far East and announced the assault on China. The key aspect of this mission was that it was a helping hand from a nation itself struggling for freedom, to another nation also struggling for its freedom. The mission was reinforced with Nehru's visit to China in 1939.

Dwarkanath Kotnis, born in a middle class Maharashtrian family from Sholapur on 10 October 1910, had then graduated from the Seth G S Medical College, Bombay and was preparing for post-graduation. He asked permission of his family to volunteer for service abroad.  Dwarkanath's younger sister Manorama recalls that her brother wanted to travel around the world and practice medicine at different places. She said "most members of the family knew little about China at that time. We only knew that people used to come and sell Chinese silk,"  While his father Shantaram encouraged young Dwarkanath to venture out, his mother was very sad because he was going that far and worse, in a war zone.

A medical team of five doctors (Drs. M. Atal from Allahabad (who was also the leader of the mission), M. Cholkar from Nagpore, D. Kotnis from Sholapur, B.K. Basu and Debesh Mukherjee from Calcutta) was dispatched as the Indian Medical Mission Team in September 1938. All, except Dr. Kotnis, returned to India safely.

The team first arrived in China at the port of Hankou, Wuhan. They were then sent to Yan'an, the revolutionary base at the time in 1939, where they were warmly welcomed by Mao Zedong, Zhu De and other top leaders of the Chinese Communist Party (CCP), as they were the first medical team to come from another Asian country.

The 28-year-old Doctor came as a part of the five member team and stayed in China for almost 5 years working in mobile clinics to treat wounded soldiers. In 1939, Dr. Kotnis joined the Eighth Route Army (led by Mao Zedong) at the Jin-Cha-Ji border near the Wutai Mountain Area, after his efforts all across the northern China region.

His job as a battlefront doctor was stressful, where there was always an acute shortage of medicines. In one long-drawn out battle against Japanese troops in 1940, Dr. Kotnis performed operations for up to 72 hours, without getting any sleep. He treated more than 800 wounded soldiers during the battle. He was eventually appointed as the Director of the Dr. Bethune International Peace Hospital named after the famous Canadian surgeon Norman Bethune.

In 1940, Dr. Kotnis met Guo Qinglan, a nurse at the Bethune Hospital. They first met at the inauguration of Dr. Norman Bethune's tomb and Guo was immediately attracted to the Indian doctor. Kotnis could write and speak Chinese, which amazed her. The couple got married in December 1941. They had a son on 23 August 1942, who was named Yinhua – meaning India (Yin) and China (Hua), at the suggestion of Nie Rongzhen.

Dr. Kotnis wrote letters to his family regularly. "He sounded very happy in the letters. People used to come to thank him for his help. He was telling the good part," says Manorama.  Every place he went in China, he described it in detail in his letters home. The whole family found them to be great fun because what he described was so different from the life in India.

The hardship of the stressful job as a front-line doctor finally started to take its toll on him and severely affected his health. Only three months after the birth of Yinhua, epilepsy struck Dr.Kotnis. A series of epileptic seizures killed him on 9 December 1942, leaving behind his widow Guo Qinglan, and the baby son.

Dr. Kotnis was buried in the Heroes Courtyard in Nanquan Village. At that time, Mao Zedong mourned his death by observing that "The army has lost a helping hand, the nation has lost a friend. Let us always bear in mind his internationalist spirit."

It is said that he joined the Chinese Communist Party on 7 July 1942, just before his death, but could not be verified.

During his mission, he was also a lecturer at the Dr. Bethune Hygiene School of the Jinchaji (晉察冀) Military Command, and the first director of the Dr. Bethune International Peace Hospital, Yan'an.

Tribute 

Upon his death in 1942, Mao Zedong mourned his death by observing that:

Madame Sun Yat-sen said, concerning his role in the revolution, that "His memory belongs not only to your people and ours, but to the noble roll-call of fighters for the freedom and progress of all mankind. The future will honor him even more than the present, because it was for the future that he struggled."

The Martyr's Memorial park in Shijiazhuang city of the Northern Chinese province of Hebei is a famous attraction point. The north and south sides of the park are dedicated to the veterans of the Korean and the Japanese wars. The west side is dedicated to Dr. Norman Bethune, who fought for the Chinese, and the South side to Dr Kotnis. There is a great statue in his honour. A small museum there has a handbook of vocabulary that Kotnis wrote on his passage from India to China; some of the instruments that the surgeons used in their medical fight for life, and various photos of the doctors, some with the Chinese Communist Party's most influential figures, including Mao.

Memorial in Solapur, Maharashtra 

A memorial of Dwarkanath Shantaram Kotnis is installed in his birthplace in Solapur on 1 January 2012. The memorial, at his old residence, has been built by Solapur Municipal Corporation with efforts of Sushilkumar Shinde, who was Union Power Minister during the installation ceremony. Maharashtra Chief Minister Prithviraj Chavan was present at the function.

Family 

In November 1941, about a year before his death, Kotnis married Guo Qinglan, (born 15 September 1916 in Fenyang County, Shanxi Province) a nurse at the Bethune International Peace Hospital. Kotnis and Guo had a son on 23 August 1942. At the suggestion of Nie Rongzhen they named the boy "Yinhua" combining the Chinese characters for "Yin" for India and "Hua" for China. Yinhua died aged 24 in 1967 shortly before he was to graduate from medical college. His death has been attributed to medical negligence. In 1949, Guo remarried to a Chinese man with whom she had a son and a daughter. Guo Qinglan has been an honoured guest at many high-level diplomatic functions between China and India, such as the banquet Dalian Mayor Bo Xilai hosted for then Indian President K.R. Narayanan in June 2000 and during the visit of then Indian Prime Minister Vajpayee to Beijing in June 2003. In November 2006, she accompanied Chinese President Hu Jintao on a state visit to India. She died on 28 June 2012 at the age of 96 in Dalian, in Northeastern China.

In film 

 The story of his life was the subject of a Hindi film with the title Dr. Kotnis Ki Amar Kahani (1946, English: The Immortal Story of Dr. Kotnis), scripted by Khwaja Ahmad Abbas, and directed by V. Shantaram, who also portrayed Kotnis in the film.
 His life was also the subject of a Chinese film Kē Dì Huá Dài Fū (1982, Dr. D.S. Kotnis), with a screenplay by Huang Zongjiang.

Honours 

Both China (1982 and 1992) and India (1993) have honoured him with stamps.

The Chinese government continues to honour his relatives in India during every high-level official trip.  His relatives (primarily sisters) were visited in Mumbai by:

 the then Premier Zhou Enlai in 1950
 the then President & CCP General Secretary Jiang Zemin visited India in 1996, he sent flowers to the Kotnis family.
 the then Premier Li Peng in 2001
 the then Premier Zhu Rongji in 2002
 the then President & CCP General Secretary Hu Jintao in 2006
 the then Premier Li Keqiang in 2013
 The current President Xi Jinping – who also holds the positions of General Secretary of the Chinese Communist Party and Chairman of the Central Military Commission, making him China's paramount leader – met Dr Kotnis' sister Manorama during Sept 2014.

Dwarkanath Kotnis is commemorated together with Dr. Bethune, and Scottish missionary and athlete, Eric Liddell in the Martyrs' Memorial Park (Lieshi Lingyuan) in Shijiazhuang, Hebei province, China.  The entire south side of the memorial is dedicated to Dr. Kotnis, where there is a great statue in his honour. A small museum there contains a handbook of vocabulary that Kotnis wrote on his passage from India to China, some of the instruments that the surgeons were forced to use in their medical fight for life, and various photos of the doctors, some with the Communist Party of China's most influential figures, including Mao.

In 2017, China presented University of Mumbai a restored handwritten condolence note written by Mao Zedong to Dr. Kotnis' family in 1950 upon his death.

References

Further reading 

 Abbas, Khwaja Ahmad. And One Did not Come Back! The Story of the Congress Medical Mission to China. Bombay: Sound Magazine, 1944.
  Basu, Dr. B. K., Light on China: Call of Yanan – Story of the Indian Medical Mission to China 1938–1943, Edited by Manjeet H. Singh. Sketches by David Olivant. Foreign Languages Press Beijing, 2003, Hardback 420pp 235 x 155mm, 
 Gao Liang: Dr. Kotnis. A Short Biography. New Book Centre, Kalkutta 1983.
 Kotnis Mangesh Shantaram: The bridge for ever. A biography of Dr. Kotnis. Somaiya, Bombay / New Delhi / Madras 1982.
 Guo Qinglan: My Life with Kotnis. Manak, New Delhi 2006.
 Sheng Xiangong, Jin Hede: Dr. Kotnis in China. Dolphin Books, Beijing 1987.
 Sheng Xiangong et al. "An Indian Freedom fighter in China: A Tribute to Dr. D. S. Kotnis", Beijing: Foreign Language Press, 1983, p. 174.
 Hán Hǎishān 韩海山 (Ed.): Kē Dìhuá zài Táng Xiàn 《柯棣华在唐县》. Héběi rénmín chūbǎnshè 河北人民出版社, Shijiazhuang 1992.

External links 

 Indiatime Article
 People's Daily Story on Kotnis' wife
 Indian Doctor's Selfless Service Remembered,article from China.org
 Bethune International Peace Hospital 

Kotnis, Dwarkanath S.
Kotnis, Dwarkanath S.
Indian military medical officers
Kotnis, Dwaraknath
Kotnis, Dwaraknath
Kotnis, Dwaraknath
University of Mumbai alumni
People from Solapur
20th-century Indian medical doctors
Medical doctors from Maharashtra
Eighth Route Army surgeons